Heliocheilus moribunda is a moth in the family Noctuidae. It is found in the Australian Capital Territory, New South Wales, the Northern Territory, Queensland and Western Australia.

The wingspan is about 30 mm.

External links
Australian Caterpillars

Heliocheilus
Moths of Australia